Ulmus parvifolia 'UPMTF (selling name ) is a Chinese Elm cultivar that was raised by Moon's Tree Farm nursery, Atlanta, United States.

Description
Rarely exceeding  in height,  has a single central leader and strong ascending branches forming a pyramidal crown. The leaves are a lustrous dark green, turning yellow to orange in autumn. The mottled bark ranges from greyish orange to greyish brown. The tree is reputed to be very fast growing.

Pests and diseases
The species and its cultivars are highly resistant, but not immune, to Dutch elm disease, and unaffected by the Elm Leaf Beetle Xanthogaleruca luteola.

Cultivation
 is not known to be in cultivation beyond North America.

Etymology
Acronym of Ulmus Parvifolia Moon Tree Farm

Accessions
North America
Bartlett Tree Experts, US. Acc. nos. 2003–925/6

Nurseries

North America
(Widely available)

Europe
Van Den Berk (UK) Ltd., London, UK

References

External links
http://www.ces.ncsu.edu/depts/hort/consumer/factsheets/trees-new/cultivars/ulmus_parvifolia.htm Ulmus parvifolia cultivar list. 
http://fletcher.ces.state.nc.us/programs/nursery/metria/metria11/warren/elm.htm Return of the Elm - the status of elms in the nursery industry in 2000. Warren, K., J. Frank Schmidt and Co.

Chinese elm cultivar
Ulmus articles missing images
Ulmus